Caíque Luiz Santos da Purificação (born 31 July 1997), simply known as Caíque, is a Brazilian professional footballer who plays as a goalkeeper for Ypiranga Futebol Clube in Brazil.

References

1997 births
Living people
Sportspeople from Salvador, Bahia
Brazilian footballers
Association football goalkeepers
Campeonato Brasileiro Série A players
Esporte Clube Vitória players
Ermis Aradippou FC players
Brazil under-20 international footballers
Rochester New York FC players
MLS Next Pro players